William Dunbar Holder (March 6, 1824 – April 26, 1900) was a prominent Confederate politician and soldier.

Biography
Holder was born in Franklin County, Tennessee, but later moved to Mississippi. He served in the state legislature in 1853 and was a colonel in the Confederate States Army in the American Civil War. In 1862, he led the 17th Mississippi Infantry Regiment in the Missouri Brigade of General Charles Clark and was wounded in the Battle of Malvern Hill. He resigned his commission after another wound sustained during the Battle of Gettysburg where he commanded the 17th Mississippi Infantry, as part of Barksdale's Mississippi Brigade. In a letter to The Clarion-Ledger in October 1886, Holden wrote the following, 

Holder represented the state in the Second Confederate Congress from 1864 to 1865. He served as a state auditor in 1890–1896.

He died in Jackson, Mississippi on April 26, 1900.

Family
He married Catharine Theresa Bowles (1837–1887) and they had six sons and one daughter.

References

External links
 Political Graveyard
 

1824 births
1900 deaths
Confederate States Army officers
Members of the Confederate House of Representatives from Mississippi
19th-century American politicians
Mississippi lawyers
Mississippi Democrats
People from Franklin County, Tennessee
19th-century American lawyers